The Sargent County Courthouse in Forman, North Dakota was built in 1910. The courthouse of Sargent County, it was designed by architects Buechner & Orth in Beaux Arts style.  It was listed on the National Register of Historic Places in 1980.

It has been described as an "economy version" of the Foster County Courthouse and Pierce County Courthouses (other North Dakota courthouses designed by Buechner & Orth).  Its front facade has a center pavilion that is "virtually identical" to that of the Foster County Courthouse, with small variations.

The interior of the building includes a skylight of geometric stained glass, and pink terrazzo and pink marble floors on the first floor.  The interior may have had murals that have been lost, but has not been changed in terms of its spaces, besides addition of a dropped ceiling of acoustical tile in the courtroom.  In particular its rotunda interior is simpler than those of other Buechner & Orth courthouses in North Dakota.

References

Courthouses on the National Register of Historic Places in North Dakota
County courthouses in North Dakota
Beaux-Arts architecture in North Dakota
Government buildings completed in 1910
National Register of Historic Places in Sargent County, North Dakota
1910 establishments in North Dakota